Edward Bożeniec Jełowicki born 1803 in Hubnik now in Western Ukraine, died 10 November 1848 in Vienna, was a Polish landowner, decorated Colonel in the Polish army, insurgent, officer in the Foreign Legion and commander of the Vienna artillery. He was an engineer and inventor.

Biography

Family
Descended from Ruthenian aristocracy, his family had been integrated into the Polish Szlachta and converted from Orthodoxy to Roman Catholicism during the Republic of Two Nations. Edward was the eldest son of Wacław Jełowicki and his wife Franciszka née Izdebska. He had two younger brothers, the publisher, writer and priest, Aleksander and Eustachy and a sister, Hortensja, who married Piotr Sobański.

Career
An alumnus of the Vienna Theresian Military Academy, he was elected Marshal of the Haisyn district. He took a leading part in the November Uprising in Ukraine, with his father and two brothers, until its undoing in 1831 when with his younger brother, Aleksander, he evaded capture by escaping into Austria-Hungary. After much travel across Europe and Algeria, he pursued further studies at the postgraduate École d’état-major in Paris and the Ecole Centrale Paris. In 1836 during a quiet spell in London, he designed and took out two British Patents on his Steam turbine, one being in England. The other patent was granted in Edinburgh for "certain improvements to his steam engine", on 16 July 1836.

Back in Paris he frequented Adam Mickiewicz, whose Paris publisher was Edward's brother, Aleksander Jełowicki. Like his brother, he was also a friend of Frederic Chopin.

Caught up in the Spring of Nations that swept over Europe in 1848, he was executed in Vienna on the order of Alfred I, Prince of Windisch-Grätz. He left a widow and two children.

Distinctions 
 Order of Virtuti Militari
 Légion d'Honneur

See also
 Jełowicki family
 Great Emigration

References

Further reading 
 Joseph Straszewicz (1839). Les Polonais et les Polonaises de la révolution du 29 novembre 1830 - biographie, Paris: chez l'Editeur, rue des Colombiers, 12, pp.1-10. (in French).
 Polytechnisches Journal. 63. Band, Jahrgang 1837, N.F. 13. Band, Hefte 1-6 komplett. (= 18. Jahrgang, 1.-6. Heft ). Eine Zeitschrift zur Verbreitung gemeinnüziger Kenntnisse im Gebiete der Naturwissenschaft, der Chemie, der Pharmacie, der Mechanik, der Manufakturen, Fabriken, Künste, Gewerbe, der Handlung, der Haus- und Landwirthschaft etc. Herausgegeben von Johann Gottfried und Emil Maximilian Dingler.
Polytechnisches Journal. Hrsg. v. Johann Gottfried Dingler, Emil Maximilian Dingler und Julius Hermann Schultes:
Published by Stuttgart in der J. G. Cotta'schen Buchhandlung (1837)., 1837 (in German)

External links 
 The Gocla collection Museum of Warsaw has a bronze medallion of Edward Jełowicki
 British Museum information entry
 - Genealogy of Edward Jełowicki in Polish

1803 births
1848 deaths
Dukes of Poland
Polish nobility
 
Members of Polish government (November Uprising)
Activists of the Great Emigration
Polish Army officers
École Centrale Paris alumni
Polish exiles
Polish inventors
Mechanical engineers
Polish Roman Catholics
Recipients of the Legion of Honour
Recipients of the Virtuti Militari
People executed by Austria-Hungary
Executed Polish people
19th-century executions by Austria